The  New York – Pennsylvania League season was the league's second season of play. The Williamsport Grays became the New York–Pennsylvania League (Now Eastern League) champions by having the best record at the end of the regular season. The New York–Pennsylvania League played at the Class B level during this season.

Final standings

Stats

Batting leaders

Pitching leaders

New York - Pennsylvania League Season, 1924
Eastern League seasons
Eastern League (1938–present)